A list of films produced by the Ollywood film industry based in Bhubaneswar and Cuttack in the 1990s:

References

1990s
Ollywood
Films, Ollywood